= Torneo Interfederale Coppa Torino =

The Torneo Interfederale Coppa Torino was a summer association football friendly tournament that took place in Turin, Italy in 1910 and 1912. In the tournament participated two teams from Turin and two invited clubs. The first edition was contested by four teams, with semifinals, third place match and final. The second edition provided that home teams played two matches with the guests and the team won with the highest number of points.

== Finals ==
Year	Champion	Result	Runners-Up	Third place	Result	Fourth place
1910	(Switzerland) FC Aarau	2–0	(Italy) FBC Torino	(Switzerland) Montriond Sports	5–0	(Italy) Juventus FC
1912	(Switzerland) FC La Chaux-de-Fonds	*	(Italy) FBC Torino	(Austria) FK Wiener Amateure	*	(Italy) Juventus FC
